Kati is a commune and town in Koulikoro, Mali.

Kati may also refer to:

 Kata people of Pakistan and Afghanistan 
 Kati language (disambiguation)
Muyu language, an Ok language of West Papua
Kata-vari dialect, spoken by the Kata in parts of Afghanistan and Pakistan
 Kati, a common abbreviation of the given name Catherine
 Kati (Tanzanian ward), a word meaning "ward"
 Kati District, in Unguja South Region, Tanzania
 Kati Province, Kenya
 Catty or kati, an East Asian measure of weight
 Kati Piri (born 1979), Dutch politician
 KATI, an FM radio station in California, Missouri
 KATI (Wyoming), a former AM radio station in Casper, Wyoming
 Kati roll, an Indian street-food dish
 Kati kati (food)

See also
 Kati Sar (disambiguation)
 
 Kadi (disambiguation)
 Katy (disambiguation)
 KT (disambiguation)
 Catty (disambiguation)